This article is about the particular significance of the year 1762 to Wales and its people.

Incumbents
Lord Lieutenant of Anglesey - Sir Nicholas Bayly, 2nd Baronet
Lord Lieutenant of Brecknockshire and Lord Lieutenant of Monmouthshire – Thomas Morgan
Lord Lieutenant of Caernarvonshire- Thomas Wynn
Lord Lieutenant of Cardiganshire – Wilmot Vaughan, 3rd Viscount Lisburne (until 27 July); Wilmot Vaughan, 1st Earl of Lisburne (from 27 July)
Lord Lieutenant of Carmarthenshire – George Rice
Lord Lieutenant of Denbighshire - Richard Myddelton  
Lord Lieutenant of Flintshire - Sir Roger Mostyn, 5th Baronet 
Lord Lieutenant of Glamorgan – Other Windsor, 4th Earl of Plymouth
Lord Lieutenant of Merionethshire - William Vaughan
Lord Lieutenant of Montgomeryshire – Henry Herbert, 1st Earl of Powis 
Lord Lieutenant of Pembrokeshire – Sir William Owen, 4th Baronet
Lord Lieutenant of Radnorshire – Howell Gwynne

Bishop of Bangor – John Egerton
Bishop of Llandaff – Richard Newcome (until 9 July); John Ewer (from 28 December)
Bishop of St Asaph – Robert Hay Drummond (until June) Richard Newcome (from 9 July)
Bishop of St Davids – Anthony Ellys (until 16 January) Samuel Squire (from 24 March)

Events
Henry Herbert, 1st Earl of Powis, leaves the Whig party.
Silvanus Bevan is elected a member of the Cymmrodorion.

Arts and literature

New books
Thomas Edwards (Twm o'r Nant) - Tri Chydymaith Dyn
Oliver Goldsmith - The Life of Richard Nash
William Williams Pantycelyn - Pantheologia, neu Hanes Holl Grefyddau’r Byd

Music
William Williams Pantycelyn - Mor o Wydr (including "Gweddi am Nerth i fyned trwy anialwch y Byd", the Welsh original of the hymn "Cwm Rhondda")

Births
12 August - George, Prince of Wales, later King George IV (died 1830)
11 October - David Charles, hymn-writer (died 1834)
date unknown 
Samuel Homfray, iron-master (died 1822)
William Jones, bookseller, religious writer, and member of the Scotch Baptist church in Finsbury, London. (died 1846)
John Williams, evangelical cleric (died 1802)

Deaths
3 February - Beau Nash, leader of fashion, 87
2 May - John Salusbury, diarist, 54
2 May - Margaret Lloyd, Moravian worker and activist, 53

References

1762 by country
1762 in Great Britain